The 1891 Pittsburgh Athletic Club football season  was their second season in existence. The team finished with an undefeated record of 7–0.

Schedule

Notes

References

Pittsburgh Athletic Club
Pittsburgh Athletic Club football seasons
Pittsburgh Athletic Club football